On 16 March 2005, Regional Airlines Flight 9288 crashed on approach to Varandey Airport in Russia's Nenetskiy Avtonomnyy Okrug, killing 28 of the 52 people on board.

Accident 

Regional Airlines Flight 9288 was an Antonov An-24RV (NATO reporting name "Coke") making a non-scheduled Russian domestic passenger flight on 16 March 2005 from Usinsk Airport in Komi to Varandey Airport in Nenetskiy Avtonomnyy Okrug with seven crew members and 45 passengers aboard. On approach to Varandey Airport, the crew allowed the An-24RV's speed to drop and its nose to rise until in stalled. At 13:53, the aircraft struck a hill, crashed about 5 kilometers (3.1 miles) from the airport, and burned, killing 28 people (two crew members and 26 passengers).

The aircraft's airspeed and angle-of-attack indicators may have malfunctioned, making it difficult for the crew to monitor flight parameters accurately.

Aircraft 

The aircraft was a twin-engine Antonov An-24RV, manufacturer's serial number 27308107. It had first flown in 1972 and was registered as RA-46489. Regional Airlines had leased it from Kuzbassaviafrakht (Kuzbass Aero Freight).

References

External links 
 

2005 disasters in Russia
Airliner accidents and incidents involving controlled flight into terrain
Aviation accidents and incidents in Russia
Aviation accidents and incidents in 2005
Accidents and incidents involving the Antonov An-24
2005 in Russia
Transport in Nenets Autonomous Okrug
March 2005 events in Europe